Mycalesis  gotama, the Chinese bushbrown, is an East Palearctic species of satyrine butterfly found in China, Japan, Assam, Burma, the northeastern Himalayas and northern Vietnam.

The larva feeds on Miscanthus sinensis,  Miscanthus floridulus , Setaria palmifolia, Isachne globosa, Oryza sativa and Bambusa species.

Subspecies
M. g. gotama
M. g. charaka Moore, [1875] (Assam, northern Vietnam, southern China)
M. g. nanda Fruhstorfer, 1908 (Taiwan)
M. g. fulginia Fruhstorfer, 1911 (Japan)

References

External links
Images representing Mycalesis at Consortium for the Barcode of Life

Mycalesis
Butterflies described in 1857